Catherine Jane Prichard (4 July 1842 – 29 March 1909), was a Welsh poet and suffragette who was also known by her pen name Buddug. She was the sister of the poet John Robert Pryse. She contributed extensively to the magazine Udgorn Cymru, and advocated for the temperance movement in Wales.

References 

1842 births
1909 deaths
19th-century Welsh poets
Welsh suffragists